San Vittore Olona is a comune (municipality) in the Province of Milan in the Italian region Lombardy, located on the river Olona and about  northwest of Milan.

Since 1933, the comune has been host to the Cinque Mulini cross country running race. The race runs through five of the town's water mills, and some of the world's most distinguished runners have competed there, including Haile Gebrselassie, Sebastian Coe, and Kenenisa Bekele.

San Vittore Olona borders the municipalities of Legnano, Cerro Maggiore, Canegrate, and Parabiago.

Demographic evolution

References

Cities and towns in Lombardy